Pierre Durand was a French Huguenot pastor and martyr. He was baptised a Catholic. He was the elder brother of Marie Durand. He was hanged at Montpellier on 22 April 1732.

The charge for which he was executed is recorded:

Five priests are recorded as being at the hanging to encourage him to abjure. He refused to do so.

References

1732 deaths
18th-century French people
Huguenots